The 2020 NAIA Division II men's basketball tournament  was the partially-completed tournament held by the NAIA to determine the national champion of men's college basketball among its Division II members in the United States and Canada for the 2019–20 basketball season.

Due to the onset of the COVID-19 pandemic, only a single round of the tournament was completed before it was ultimately cancelled by the NAIA. In turn, no champion was crowned.

The NAIA had pre-determined that this would be the final edition of a separate Division II tournament, planning to consolidate its two divisional tournaments back into a single event for 2021. With the cancellation of this event, the 2019 event was the last completed edition of the tournament.

The completed games of the tournament were played at the Sanford Pentagon in Sioux Falls, South Dakota.

Qualification

Bracket

See also
2020 NAIA Division I men's basketball tournament
2020 NCAA Division I men's basketball tournament
2020 NCAA Division II men's basketball tournament
2020 NCAA Division III men's basketball tournament
2020 NAIA Division II women's basketball tournament

References

NAIA
NAIA Men's Basketball Championship
2020 in sports in South Dakota
NAIA Division II men's basketball tournament, 2020